Lectionary 150, designated by siglum ℓ 150 (in the Gregory-Aland numbering), is also known as Codex Harleianus. It is a Greek manuscript of the New Testament, on vellum leaves and one of four extant Greek lectionaries with explicit dates from before 1000.

Description 

The manuscript is written in compressed Greek Uncial letters, on 374 parchment leaves (35.2 cm by 26.7 cm), in 2 columns per page, 21 lines per page, with ornaments. The capital letters and nomina sacra are in red ink. The codex includes ten leaves of paper containing a series of Lessons from the Gospels, John, Matthew and the Luke lectionary (Evangelistarium). The image shows the text of John 1:18.

It is one of the most beautiful lectionary codices, with a scribal date of 27 May 995 A.D. 'It is a most splendid specimen of the uncial class of Evangelistaria, and its text presents many instructive variations.'
It also contains musical notation.

History 

According to the colophon it was written by a presbyter called Constantine.
The manuscript came from Constantinople. In 1677 John Covel, chaplain of the English embassy in Constantinople, purchased this manuscript. It was shown by him to John Mill (1645-1707), in London. From Covell it was purchased – together with other manuscripts – by Robert Harley, Earl of Oxford.

It was collated by Bloomfield and examined by Woide.

The manuscript is often cited in the critical editions of the Greek New Testament (UBS3). It is not cited in UBS4.

The codex now is located in the British Library (Harley MS 5598).

See also 

 List of New Testament lectionaries
 Biblical manuscript
 Textual criticism

Notes and references

Bibliography 

 F. H. A. Scrivener, An Exact Transcript of the Codex Augiensis, to which is added a full Collation of Fifty Manuscripts, London 1859, pp. 47–50.
 Henri Omont, Notes sur les manuscrits grecs du British Museum, Bibliothèque de l’École des Chartes, 45 (1884), p. 337.
 Edward Maunde Thompson, An introduction to Greek and Latin palaeography, Clarendon Press: Oxford 1912, p. 216.

External links 

 Harley MS 5598 at the British Library
 

Greek New Testament lectionaries
10th-century biblical manuscripts
Harleian Collection